Canal Zone is a 1942 American aviation adventure film starring Chester Morris and Forrest Tucker. The action takes place in the Panama Canal Zone and revolves around aviators in an out-of-the-way air base flying U.S. Army bombers.

Plot
Ginger Bar, a former banana-shipping station on the outskirts of the Panama Canal, had been converted to a training-and-relay station for the U. S. Army. The Commander Merrill (Stanley Andrews), an ex-service flier, is in charge of the station It is his job to train civilian airmen to handle bombers, transforming them into pilots of the "flying fortresses. They will fly bombers to Africa and back for further training.

As one of a new group of pilot, the conceited, reckless society playboy, Harley Ames (John Hubbard), arrives at Ginger Bar. The others include Kincaid (Larry Parks), from Alabama, Madigan (Forrest Tucker), an ex- marine; Hughes, a former player with the Brooklyn Dodgers and Baldwin (Lloyd Bridges), a former insurance agent who trained with the Civil Aeronautics Board.

Although he is a capable pilot, Ames immediately incurs the animosity of the training-officer, "Hardtack" Hamilton (Chester Morris). Not only is Ames reckless, he is also making a play for Susan Merril (Harriet Hilliard), the Commanding Officer's daughter with whom "Tack" is in love.

Because of a broken date by Susan, Ames gets drunk and, the next day, crashes his aircraft on combat training crashing his aircraft into Kincaid's, killing his friend. Now, he must redeem himself. He will get a chance when "Tack" and another pilot have a crash in the jungle. Ames, knowing that Susan is in love with Tack, takes off without orders He locates Tack in the jungle and brings him safely home to Susan. When the squadron takes off again, Ames leaves for Africa, declaring that he intends to find a little excitement there.

Cast

 Chester Morris as "Hardtack" Hamilton
 Harriet Hilliard as Susan Merrill
 John Hubbard as Harley Ames
 Larry Parks as Kincaid
 Forrest Tucker as Madigan
 Eddie Laughton as Hughes
 Lloyd Bridges as Baldwin
 George McKay as MacNamara
 Stanley Andrews as Commander Merrill
 John Tyrrell as "Red" Connors
 Stanley Brown as Jones
 John Shay as Henshaw
 Paul Phillips as Bailey
 Arthur O'Connell as Fledgling
 Hugh Beaumont as Radio operator
 Betty Roadman as Pearl
 Louis Jean Heydt as Ralph Merrill
 James Kahn as Monkey vendor

Production
Canal Zone was based on the short story "Heroes Come High" by Blaine Miller and Jean Dupont Miller in American Magazine (February 1937).

Reception
Theodore Stauss, film reviewer for The New York Times, thought Canal Zone "silly", writing: "The characters of their Central American relay and training station are too silly to find their bearings in a third-rate drama, much less in the air. Though there is some highfalutin' talk about destiny and 'kicking the sky around,' the story of "Canal Zone" never gets its wheels off the ground."

Aviation film historian James H. Farmer, dismissed the film as "(a) fourth-rate B film." In Aviation in the Cinema, aviation film historian Stephen Pendo considered Canal Zone, "... a cliché ridden effort."

See also
Naval Base Panama Canal Zone

References

Notes

Citations

Bibliography

 Farmer, James H. Celluloid Wings: The Impact of Movies on Aviation. Blue Ridge Summit, Pennsylvania: Tab Books Inc., 1984. .
 Pendo, Stephen. Aviation in the Cinema. Lanham, Maryland: Scarecrow Press, 1985. .

External links

Canal Zone at TCMDB

1942 films
American aviation films
American adventure drama films
Columbia Pictures films
Films directed by Lew Landers
1940s adventure drama films
American black-and-white films
1942 drama films
1940s English-language films
1940s American films